Lamar Reynolds (born 16 August 1995) is a Jamaican professional footballer for National League South side Braintree Town.

Early life
Reynolds was born in Jamaica and moved to the United Kingdom when he was eight years old.

Career

Non-League career
Reynolds began his career with Barking, joining the club's youth academy at the age of 16. He graduated into the first-team during the 2012–13 season, scoring his first goals for the club with a brace during a 6–1 victory over Sporting Bengal United on 5 January 2013. He later played for Thurrock, scoring once in 23 league appearances, and Aveley before joining Grays Athletic in 2015.
On 6 November 2015, Reynolds joined Heybridge Swifts on loan, making his debut the following day in a 3–1 defeat to Soham Town Rangers. He went on to play in a further seven matches in all competitions for the club.

In January 2016, Reynolds returned to his first club Barking after failing to break into the first-team with Grays, having featured in 12 league matches for the club. Despite only playing the second half of the season, Reynolds finished as Barking's second highest top scorer with 10 goals in 15 appearances, including a hat-trick during an 8–0 victory over Tower Hamlets on 8 March 2016. Reynolds joined Isthmian League North Division club Brentwood Town for the 2016–17 season, scoring 27 goals in 38 matches.

Newport County
In June 2017, Reynolds was one of 42 players who attended the V9 Academy, a week long training programme set up by England international Jamie Vardy to showcase players from non-League clubs to scouts, at the Etihad Campus in Manchester. After impressing scouts at the academy, Reynolds joined League Two side Newport County on a two-year deal. He made his professional debut on the opening day of the 2017–18 season in a 3–3 draw at Stevenage.

On 4 January 2018, Reynolds joined Leyton Orient on loan for the remainder of the 2017–18 season.

Dagenham & Redbridge
On 2 July 2018, Reynolds joined Dagenham & Redbridge on a free transfer with Newport securing a sell on clause as part of the deal. On 21 March 2019, Chelmsford City signed Reynolds on loan until the end of the season. In May 2019, it was announced that he would be released following the expiration of his contract at the end of the 2018–19 campaign.

Concord Rangers
On 20 June 2019, he signed for National League South side Concord Rangers on a free transfer following his release from Dagenham.

Braintree Town
On 25 August 2022, Reynolds joined fellow National League South side, Braintree Town following his release from Concord Rangers.

Career statistics

Honours
Concord Rangers
FA Trophy runner-up: 2019–20

References

External links

1995 births
Living people
Jamaican footballers
Barking F.C. players
Thurrock F.C. players
Aveley F.C. players
Grays Athletic F.C. players
Heybridge Swifts F.C. players
Brentwood Town F.C. players
Newport County A.F.C. players
Leyton Orient F.C. players
Dagenham & Redbridge F.C. players
Chelmsford City F.C. players
Concord Rangers F.C. players
Braintree Town F.C. players
Isthmian League players
English Football League players
National League (English football) players
V9 Academy players
Association football forwards